is a Japanese former football player and manager. He played for Japan national team. Actress Masami Nagasawa is his daughter.

Club career
Nagasawa was born in Shizuoka on February 4, 1958. After graduating from Tokyo University of Agriculture, he joined Yamaha Motors in 1980. Although he played as regular player, he could not play in the game at the end of his career for injury. He retired in 1989. He played 123 games and scored 9 goals in the league.

National team career
On July 13, 1978, when Nagasawa was a Tokyo University of Agriculture student, he debuted for Japan national team against Iraq. Although he did not play for Japan from 1979, in 1985, he played for Japan at 1986 World Cup qualification for the first time in 7 years. He played 9 games for Japan until 1985.

Coaching career
After retirement, Nagasawa started coaching career at Yamaha Motors (later Júbilo Iwata). In 1991, he became a manager. He led the club to won 2nd place at Japan Football League in 1993 and promoted to J1 League. He resigned end of 1993 season. He signed with L.League club Suzuyo Shimizu FC Lovely Ladies in 1995. In 1997, he moved to Honda. In 1999, he signed with Sony Sendai and managed until August 2001. From 2001, he managed some university and high school.

Club statistics

National team statistics

References

External links
 
 Japan National Football Team Database

1958 births
Living people
Tokyo University of Agriculture alumni
Association football people from Shizuoka Prefecture
Japanese footballers
Japan international footballers
Japan Soccer League players
Júbilo Iwata players
Japanese football managers
Júbilo Iwata managers
Association football midfielders
Japanese association football commentators